Nudi is a surname of Italian or Spanish descent. The origin of the name is the plural form of the word "nudo" meaning naked.

References

Italian-language surnames